Chionelasmatidae is a family of barnacles belonging to the order Balanomorpha.

Genera:
 Chionelasmus Pilsbry, 1911
 Eochionelasmus Yamaguchi, 1990

References

Sessilia
Crustacean families